Microhyla fissipes (commonly known as the ornate chorus frog) is a microhylid frog from East and Southeast Asia, from southern and central China and Taiwan to the Malay Peninsula. It was previously considered to be the same species as Microhyla ornata of South Asia; thus the common names ornate narrow-mouthed frog or ornamented pygmy frog can refer to either species.

Description

As microhylids in general, Microhyla fissipes is a small frog: males reach  and females  in snout-vent length.

Habitat and behaviour
Microhyla fissipes is a common and widespread species. It can be found in many habitat types including lowland scrub forests, grassland, agricultural land, pastureland and urban areas. Sub-fossorial in habit, it is also found in forest floor leaf-litter. It is mostly nocturnal, only active diurnally during the rainy season. It breeds in rain pools and other bodies of still water. It tolerates habitat modification and can also occur in non-intensively farmed agricultural land. In the Peninsular Malaysia, it inhabits upper hill and montane forest where they can be found on low vegetation or around puddles or waterlogged areas.

See also
 Microhyla letovirus 1 – a phylogenetically distinct species of virus hosted by M. fissipes

References

External links
 
 

fissipes
Amphibians of Myanmar
Amphibians of Cambodia
Amphibians of China
Fauna of Hong Kong
Amphibians of Indonesia
Amphibians of Laos
Amphibians of Malaysia
Amphibians of Singapore
Amphibians of Taiwan
Amphibians of Thailand
Amphibians of Vietnam
Amphibians described in 1884